Fritz Jüptner-Jonstorff (1908–1993) was an Austrian art director who worked on more than a hundred films during his career. Jüptner-Jonstorff was one of the leading figures in his field in Europe, designing sets for films such as Victoria in Dover (1954) and Sissi (1955).

Selected filmography
 The Heart Must Be Silent (1944)
 The Immortal Face (1947)
 Anni (1948)
 Fregola (1948)
 Ulli and Marei (1948)
 Queen of the Landstrasse (1948)
 The Heavenly Waltz (1948)
 Mountain Crystal (1949)
 Lambert Feels Threatened (1949)
 Theodore the Goalkeeper (1950)
 A Tale of Five Cities (1951)
 Call Over the Air (1951)
 Gateway to Peace (1951)
 Adventure in Vienna (1952)
 Knall and Fall as Imposters  (1952)
 Anna Louise and Anton (1953)
 Grandstand for General Staff (1953)
 To Be Without Worries (1953)
 Victoria in Dover (1954)
 Sissi (1955)
 Marriage Sanitarium (1955)
 The Doctor's Secret (1955)
 The Blue Danube (1955)
 The Dairymaid of St. Kathrein (1955)
 Opera Ball (1956)
 Twelve Girls and One Man (1959)
 Guitars Sound Softly Through the Night (1960)
 Crime Tango (1960)
 The Adventures of Count Bobby (1961)
 The Sweet Life of Count Bobby (1962)
 Wedding Night in Paradise (1962)
 An Alibi for Death (1963)
 The Model Boy (1963)
 Schweik's Awkward Years (1964)
 In Bed by Eight (1965)

References

Bibliography
 Robert Dassanowsky. Austrian Cinema: A History. McFarland, 2005.

External links

1908 births
1993 deaths
Austrian art directors
Film people from Vienna